Zhu Shuang (3 December 1356 – 19 April 1395) was an imperial prince of the Chinese Ming dynasty. He was the second son of the Hongwu Emperor, the founder of the Ming. In May 1370, the Hongwu Emperor granted the title of Prince of Qin to him, with a princely fiefdom in Xi'an.

Biography
After his father ascended the throne, Zhu Shuang was granted the title Prince of Qin in 1370, then took his fief located in Xi'an eight years later. As he was the imperial second eldest son, he took the office Commander of Imperial Clan Court (宗人令).

Family
Consorts and Issue:
 Consort Minlie, of the Wang clan (愍烈妃 王氏; d. 1395), the primary consort, younger sister of Köke Temür
 Zhu Shangbing, Prince Yin of Qin (秦隱王 朱尚炳; 25 November 1380 - 21 April 1412), first son
 Zhu Shanglie, Prince Yijian of Yongxing (永興懿簡王 朱尚烈; 29 September 1384 - 22 February 1417), second son
 Zhu Shangyu, Prince Daoxi of Bao'an (保安悼僖王 朱尚煜; 20 November 1385 - 25 February 1410), third son
 Lady, of the Deng clan (鄧氏), the secondary consort, daughter of Deng Yu (鄧愈)
 Zhu Shanghong, Prince Huaijian of Yongshou (永壽懷簡王 朱尚灴; 17 April 1390 - 19 September 1420), fifth son
 Lady, of the Zhang clan (張氏)
 Zhu Shangzhou, Prince Gongjing of Xingping (興平恭靖王 朱尚烐; 19 October 1389 - 15 May 1449), fourth son 
 Unknown
 Zhu Shangkai (朱尚炌; b. 4 December 1394), initially was made Prince of Anding (安定王), later stripped of his title, sixth son
 Princess Pucheng (蒲城郡主)
 Princess Chang'an (長安郡主)
 Married Ru Jian (茹鑒), son of Ru Chang (茹瑺)

Ancestry

References

1356 births
1395 deaths
Ming dynasty imperial princes
Sons of emperors